Campamento Militar Isla Guadalupe is a locality in Ensenada Municipality, Baja California, Mexico. It is located in Guadalupe Island, at an altitude of 640 meters. It is distinguished for being the westmost location in Mexico and Latin America.

References

Cities in Ensenada Municipality